Martin David Ginsburg (June 10, 1932 – June 27, 2010) was an American lawyer who specialized in tax law and was the husband of American lawyer and U.S. Supreme Court Justice Ruth Bader Ginsburg. He taught law at Georgetown University Law Center in Washington, D.C. and was of counsel in the Washington, D.C. office of the American law firm Fried, Frank, Harris, Shriver & Jacobson.

Early life and education
Ginsburg was born in Brooklyn, New York to Evelyn (née Bayer) and Morris Ginsburg, a department store executive. He grew up in Rockville Centre, Long Island, where he attended South Side High School. His family was Jewish. Ginsburg earned a B.A. in chemistry from Cornell University in 1953 and a J.D. (magna cum laude) from Harvard Law School in 1958. He was a star on Cornell's golf team. After finishing a year at law school, Ginsburg married Joan Ruth Bader in 1954, after her graduation from Cornell. That same year, Ginsburg, a ROTC graduate commissioned in the Army Reserve, was called up for active duty and stationed at Fort Sill, Oklahoma for two years. In 1956, he returned to law school, transferring to Harvard Law School along with his wife's admission there. During his third year at Harvard, Ginsburg endured two operations and radiation therapy to treat testicular cancer.

Career
After graduating from law school in 1958, Ginsburg joined the firm Weil, Gotshal & Manges. He was subsequently admitted to the bar in New York in 1959 and in the District of Columbia in 1980.

Ginsburg taught at New York University Law School as an adjunct faculty member from 1967 to 1979. He was a visiting professor at Stanford Law School (1977–1978), Harvard Law School (1985–1986), the University of Chicago Law School (1989–1990), and New York University School of Law   (1992–1993). He was a tenured professor at Columbia Law School (Charles Keller Beekman Professor of Law) from 1979 to 1980, and at Georgetown Law Center from 1980 until his death in 2010.

In 1971, Ginsburg's firm represented Ross Perot in a business matter, and the two men became close friends. After President Jimmy Carter nominated his wife to the U.S. Court of Appeals for the District of Columbia Circuit in 1980, Ginsburg reached out to Perot and other influential friends to assure her Senate confirmation. In 1984, Ginsburg resolved complex tax questions that threatened General Motors's acquisition of Perot's Electronic Data Systems. In 1986, Perot endowed the Martin Ginsburg chair in taxation at Georgetown, although Ginsburg himself never held this seat.

Personal life and marriage

Shortly after graduating from Cornell in 1954, Ginsburg married Ruth Bader on June 23. Ruth said she and Martin decided whatever profession they pursued, they would pursue it together. The couple chose law, and both studied at Harvard Law School.

They are the parents of Jane Carol Ginsburg (born 1955), and James Steven Ginsburg (born 1965). Martin often told people how he did not make Law Review at Harvard, and Ruth did, sharing how he was proud of her successes, even when they were above his own. However, as he was also very successful in his career as a tax attorney, the couple enjoyed supporting one another and maintaining balance. Ginsburg was quoted as saying, "We had nearly two whole years far from school, far from career pressures and far from relatives, to learn about each other and begin to build a life." They thrived in their own domains. As his lighthearted self, Martin liked to say he was very lucky to have gotten in on an incredible journey by marrying Ruth, on her pathway to the Supreme Court.

Death

Martin David Ginsburg died from cancer on June 27, 2010 at the age of 78. As a US Army Reserve ROTC officer, he was buried at Arlington National Cemetery. Following her death from pancreatic cancer in 2020, Ruth Ginsburg was laid to rest in Arlington next to her husband.

In popular culture
In the 2018 film On the Basis of Sex, a biography of Ruth Bader Ginsburg, Marty is portrayed by Armie Hammer, with Ruth played by Felicity Jones.

Writings
Martin D. Ginsburg, Spousal Transfers: In '58, It Was Different, Harvard Law Record, May 6, 1977, at 11

coauth, "Maintaining Subchapter S in an Integrated Tax World," Tax Law Rev 47 (93)
coauth, "The Subchapter S One Class of Stock Regulation, Tax Notes 69 (95): 233
auth, "The S Corporation Reform Act: Generally a Good Start, Tax Notes 67 (95): 1825
auth, "The Taxpayer Relief Act of 1997: Worse Than You Think, Tax Notes 76 (97): 1790
coauth, "Evaluating Proposals to Tax Intragroup Spin-Offs, Tax Notes (97)
auth, "Taxing the Components of Income: A U.S. Perspective, Georgetown Law J, 23 (97)
auth, "Some Thoughts on Working, Saving, and Consuming in Nunn–Domenici's Tax World," Nat Tax J 48 (97): 585
repub, Tax Policy in the Real World, Cambridge Univ Press, 99
auth, "Presentation: U.S. Tax Court's Memorial Service for Senior Judge Theodore Tannenwald, Jr.," TC (99)
"In Memoriam: Theodore Tannenwald, Jr.," Tax Lawyer (99)

References

External links
The New York Times: Martin D. Ginsburg, 78, dies

1932 births
2010 deaths
Cornell University alumni
Harvard Law School alumni
Georgetown University Law Center faculty
Harvard Law School faculty
Stanford Law School faculty
Columbia Law School faculty
New York University faculty
University of Chicago Law School faculty
United States Army officers
Deaths from cancer in Washington, D.C.
Burials at Arlington National Cemetery
Lawyers from Brooklyn
People from Long Island
New York (state) lawyers
Lawyers from Washington, D.C.
Military personnel from New York City
People associated with Fried, Frank, Harris, Shriver & Jacobson
Ginsburg family
Deaths from bone cancer
20th-century American lawyers
Tax lawyers
21st-century American Jews